Pelargonium sidoides is a plant native to South Africa. Its common names include African geranium and South African geranium.

Description
African geranium forms a basal rosette of cordate leaves with a velvet texture and a few short trichomes on long petioles. Its flowers have five dark red to nearly black petals, two of which are sometimes fused. It is often found in flower nearly year-round. It prefers to grow in grasslands with rocky soils. It can be difficult to distinguish from Pelargonium reniforme which grows in a similar area, but tends to have more kidney-shaped leaves.

Uses
In cultivation in the UK, Pelargonium sidoides has received the Royal Horticultural Society's Award of Garden Merit. If grown as a perennial it requires protection in winter, as it does not tolerate temperatures below . It needs a sunny, sheltered position.

A 2013 Cochrane review found limited to no evidence of benefit with Pelargonium sidoides root extract for the symptoms of acute bronchitis, the common cold and acute rhinosinusitis. A summary of this review found that all studies were "from the same investigator (the manufacturer) and performed in the same region (Ukraine and Russia)."

Root extract of Pelargonium sidoides may be sold as a dietary supplement or traditional medicine under various brand names, including Umckaloabo and Zucol, but there is limited high-quality clinical evidence it provides any benefit.

References

sidoides
Flora of South Africa
Medicinal plants of Africa